was a Japanese photographer.

References

Japanese photographers
1842 births
1908 deaths